Luiz Firmino de Carvalho Júnior (born March 18, 1982), commonly known as Luiz Buscapé, is a Brazilian mixed martial artist, who fights at Lightweight. He has spent the majority of his career in Japan and has fought in Dream, Pride FC and Shooto. He now fights for the Blackzilians camp out of JACO HYbrid Training Center in Boca Raton, Florida.

Biography
Firmino began his career at the tenth edition of the World Vale Tudo Championship in Recife, Brazil when he was 18 years old. The tournament was held in one night and was fought under Vale Tudo-style rules. After defeating Reginaldo Santana and Sergei Bytchkov, he reached the final and faced Eli Soares. The fight lasted for thirty minutes with no breaks and Soares won by decision.

Firmino then returned two years later at the M-1 Global event MFC: Russia vs the World 3 in Saint Petersburg, Russia where he again beat Sergei Bytchkov, by technical knockout in the second round. At Russia vs the World 5 the following year, he defeated Musail Allaudinov via unanimous decision after one fifteen-minute round. After winning his next four bouts - three by submission - he was given a chance to compete in the Pride Fighting Championships.

Pride Fighting Championships
Firmino faced off against Hiroyuki Abe at his first Pride fight, Pride Bushido 4 in July 2004, and won by using an arm triangle choke in the first round. Firmino then returned against Masakazu Imanari three months later at Pride Bushido 5 at won by unanimous decision. After this early success, he lost his next two bouts (against countryman Luiz Azeredo and Tatsuya Kawajiri) by decision in 2005. In November 2006, Firmino took on Nobuhiro Obiya at Pride Bushido 13 and won the fight by yet another unanimous decision.

Dream
Pride FC then shut down, however, and Firmino soon signed with Dream. He made his debut with the organization at its first event, Dream 1, in March 2008 where he submitted Kazuyuki Miyata with a rear-naked choke seven minutes into the first round. At Dream 3 two months later, he was given the opportunity to avenge his earlier loss to Tatsuya Kawajiri. He was unable to do this, however, and was beaten on a unanimous decision.

Post-Japan
Firmino then left Dream after this, and won his first fight outside Japan in five years when he beat Ryan Healy in Miami, Florida at Shine Fights 2: ATT vs. The World in September 2009.

Firmino also returned to fight in his native Brazil for the first time in almost seven years when he faced Francisco Trinaldo at Bitetti Combat MMA 6, where he was submitted with a kneebar.

Firmino competed at Superior Cage Combat 3, where he lost against UFC and Pride veteran, Canadian John Alessio via decision.

Firmino defeated The Ultimate Fighter: Live alumni Johnavan Vistante by submission due to an arm-triangle choke in the first round at CFA 07: Never Give Up in Coral Gables, Florida on June 30, 2012.

Firmino defeated two-time Bellator Tournament finalist, and 2009 Submission of the year winner Toby Imada by unanimous decision at CFA 08 in Hollywood, Florida on October 6, 2012.

Firmino faced Bellator veteran Luis Palomino on January 19, 2013 for the CFA Lightweight Championship, Firmino dominated Palomino with his Wrestling and ground and pound to take home the CFA Lightweight Championship by unanimous decision. Firmino vacated the title in September 2013 when he signed with World Series of Fighting.

World Series of Fighting
Firmino made his WSOF debut against Jacob Volkmann at WSOF 6 on October 26, 2013. He won the fight via unanimous decision. He then faced UFC veteran Tyson Griffin at WSOF 10 on June 21, 2014. He won the back-and-forth fight via unanimous decision.

After almost two years away from the promotion, Firmino returned in January 2016 to face Strikeforce and UFC veteran Caros Fodor at WSOF 27.  He won the fight by unanimous decision.

Firmino faced Brian Foster at WSOF 33 on October 7 in Kansas City, Missouri. He lost the fight by submission in the first round. 

Firmino stepped in for an injured João Zeferino to take on WSOF Lightweight Champion Justin Gaethje at WSOF 34.  After a back-and-forth three rounds, the bout was stopped by the doctor between rounds three and four due to Firmino's swollen right eye; the end result was a TKO loss for Firmino.

The Ultimate Fighter
Firmino was as a cast member for The Ultimate Fighter: American Top Team vs. Blackzilians representing  Blackzilians  He defeated Uros Jurisic by unanimous decision to win 25 points for his team.

Championships and accomplishments
Championship Fighting Alliance
CFA Lightweight Championship (One time)

Mixed martial arts record

|-
| Loss
|align=center|20–10
|Rashid Magomedov
| Decision (unanimous)
|PFL 5
|
|align=center|3
|align=center|5:00
|Uniondale, New York, United States
|-
| Loss
| align=center|20–9
| Will Brooks
| Decision (unanimous)
| PFL 2
| 
| align=center| 3
| align=center| 5:00
| Chicago, Illinois, United States
| 
|-
|Win
|align=center|20–8
|Eddy Ellis
|TKO (punches)
|PFL: Everett
|
|align=center|1
|align=center|1:45
|Everett, Washington, United States
|
|-
|Loss
|align=center|19–8
|Justin Gaethje
|TKO (doctor stoppage)
|WSOF 34
|
|align=center|3
|align=center|5:00
|New York City, New York, United States
|
|-
|Loss
|align=center|19–7
|Brian Foster
|Submission (triangle choke)
|WSOF 33
|
|align=center|1
|align=center|3:14
|Kansas City, Missouri, United States
|
|-
| Win
| align=center| 19–6
| Caros Fodor
| Decision (unanimous)
| WSOF 27
| 
| align=center| 3
| align=center| 5:00
| Memphis, Tennessee, United States
|
|-
| Win
| align=center| 18–6
| Tyson Griffin
| Decision (unanimous)
| WSOF 10
| 
| align=center| 3
| align=center| 5:00
| Las Vegas, Nevada, United States
|
|-
| Win
| align=center| 17–6
| Jacob Volkmann
| Decision (unanimous)
| WSOF 6
| 
| align=center| 3
| align=center| 5:00
| Coral Gables, Florida, United States
| 
|-
| Win
| align=center| 16–6
| Luis Palomino
| Decision (unanimous)
| CFA 09: Night of Champions
| 
| align=center| 5
| align=center| 5:00
| Coral Gables, Florida, United States
| 
|-
| Win
| align=center| 15–6
| Toby Imada
| Decision (unanimous)
| CFA 08: Araujo vs. Bradley
| 
| align=center| 3
| align=center| 5:00
| Hollywood, Florida, United States
| 
|-
| Win
| align=center| 14–6
| Johnavan Vistante
| Submission (arm-triangle choke)
| CFA 07: Never Give Up
| 
| align=center| 1
| align=center| 4:31
| Coral Gables, Florida, United States
| 
|-
| Loss
| align=center| 13–6
| John Alessio
| Decision (unanimous)
| Superior Cage Combat 3
| 
| align=center| 3
| align=center| 5:00
| Las Vegas, Nevada, United States
| 
|-
| Loss
| align=center| 13–5
| Francisco Trinaldo
| Submission (kneebar)
| Bitetti Combat MMA 6
| 
| align=center| 1
| align=center| 2:03
| Brasília, Brazil
| 
|-
| Win
| align=center| 13–4
| Ryan Healy
| Decision (unanimous)
| Shine Fights 2: ATT vs. The World
| 
| align=center| 3
| align=center| 5:00
| Miami, Florida, United States
| 
|-
| Loss
| align=center| 12–4
| Tatsuya Kawajiri
| Decision (unanimous)
| Dream 3: Lightweight Grand Prix 2008 Second Round
| 
| align=center| 2
| align=center| 5:00
| Saitama, Japan
| 
|-
| Win
| align=center| 12–3
| Kazuyuki Miyata
| Submission (rear-naked choke)
| Dream 1: Lightweight Grand Prix 2008 First Round
| 
| align=center| 1
| align=center| 7:37
| Saitama, Japan
| 
|-
| Win
| align=center| 11–3
| Nobuhiro Obiya
| Decision (unanimous)
| Pride - Bushido 13
| 
| align=center| 2
| align=center| 5:00
| Yokohama, Japan
| 
|-
| Loss
| align=center| 10–3
| Tatsuya Kawajiri
| Decision (unanimous)
| Pride Bushido 8
| 
| align=center| 2
| align=center| 5:00
| Nagoya, Japan, Japan
| 
|-
| Loss
| align=center| 10–2
| Luiz Azeredo
| Decision (split)
| Pride Bushido 6
| 
| align=center| 2
| align=center| 5:00
| Yokohama, Japan
| 
|-
| Win
| align=center| 10–1
| Masakazu Imanari
| Decision (unanimous)
| Pride Bushido 5
| 
| align=center| 2
| align=center| 5:00
| Osaka, Japan
| 
|-
| Win
| align=center| 9–1
| Hiroyuki Abe
| Submission (arm-triangle choke)
| Pride Bushido 4
| 
| align=center| 1
| align=center| 2:56
| Nagoya, Japan
| 
|-
| Win
| align=center| 8–1
| Rafles la Rose
| Submission (armbar)
| Shooto: Switzerland 1
| 
| align=center| 1
| align=center| 0:36
| Zürich, Switzerland
| 
|-
| Win
| align=center| 7–1
| Devanir Marques
| Submission (punches)
| Conquista Fight 1
| 
| align=center| 1
| align=center| 1:10
| Vitória da Conquista, Brazil
| 
|-
| Win
| align=center| 6–1
| Kohei Yasumi
| Decision (unanimous)
| Shooto - 9/5 in Korakuen Hall
| 
| align=center| 3
| align=center| 5:00
| Tokyo, Japan
| 
|-
| Win
| align=center| 5–1
| Tom Kirk
| Submission (armbar)
| Shooto: Midwest Fighting
| 
| align=center| 1
| align=center| 3:38
| Hammond, Indiana, United States
| 
|-
| Win
| align=center| 4–1
| Musail Allaudinov
| Decision (unanimous)
| M-1 MFC - Russia vs. the World 5
| 
| align=center| 1
| align=center| 15:00
| St. Petersburg, Russia
| 
|-
| Win
| align=center| 3–1
| Sergei Bytchkov
| TKO (punches)
| M-1 MFC: Russia vs. the World 3
| 
| align=center| 2
| align=center| 2:38
| St. Petersburg, Russia
| 
|-
| Loss
| align=center| 2–1
| Eli Soares
| Decision
| WVC: World Vale Tudo Championship 10
| 
| align=center| 1
| align=center| 30:00
| Recife, Brazil
| 
|-
| Win
| align=center| 2–0
| Sergei Bytchkov
| Decision (unanimous)
| WVC: World Vale Tudo Championship 10
| 
| align=center| 2
| align=center| 14:00
| Recife, Brazil
| 
|-
| Win
| align=center| 1–0
| Reginaldo Santana
| Submission (verbal) 
| WVC: World Vale Tudo Championship 10
| 
| align=center| 1
| align=center| 3:29
| Recife, Brazil
|

References

External links

1982 births
Living people
Brazilian male mixed martial artists
Lightweight mixed martial artists
Mixed martial artists utilizing Brazilian jiu-jitsu
Brazilian practitioners of Brazilian jiu-jitsu
People from Paraíba
Sportspeople from Rio de Janeiro (city)
People awarded a black belt in Brazilian jiu-jitsu